Chaman Ara Begum ( – 28 March 2018) was a Bangladeshi politician from Jessore belonging to Bangladesh Nationalist Party. She was a member of the Jatiya Sangsad.

Biography
Begum was the president of Jessore unit of Mahila Dal. She was elected as a member of the Jatiya Sangsad from Reserved Women's Seat-11 in 2001.

Begum died on 28 March 2018 at Green Life Hospital in Dhaka at the age of 75.

References

2018 deaths
8th Jatiya Sangsad members
People from Jessore District
Bangladesh Nationalist Party politicians
Women members of the Jatiya Sangsad
21st-century Bangladeshi women politicians